United States gubernatorial elections were held on November 6, 1917, in two states. Virginia holds its gubernatorial elections in odd numbered years, every 4 years, following the United States presidential election year. Massachusetts at this time held gubernatorial elections every year, which it would abandon in 1920.

Results

References

Notes 

 
November 1917 events
United States home front during World War I